The 1907 Oklahoma gubernatorial election was held on September 17, 1907, and was the inaugural race for Governor of Oklahoma. Democrat Charles N. Haskell defeated Republican Frank Frantz, the territorial governor.  Also on the ballot was C. C. Ross of the Socialist Party.

Results

References

1907
Gubernatorial
Okla